Enrico Castelli (February 22, 1909 – September 21, 1983) was an Italian basketball player who competed in the 1936 Summer Olympics. He was part of the Italian basketball team, which finished seventh in the Olympic tournament. He played three matches.

References

External links
part 7 the basketball tournament
Enrico Castelli's profile at Sports Reference.com
Report on Italian Olympic basketball players 

1909 births
1983 deaths
Italian men's basketball players
Olympic basketball players of Italy
Basketball players at the 1936 Summer Olympics
Basketball players from Milan